Phanaeus changdiazi is a species of beetle found in Panama and Costa Rica.  It is named after Franklin Chang-Díaz, a Costa Rican-American physicist and former NASA astronaut.

References

changdiazi